Golnoosh Khosravi (born 12 May 2001) is an Iranian footballer who plays as a winger. She is a member of the Iranian women football team and club Bam Khatoon F.C. In 2019, at the age of 18, She became the youngest Iranian woman football player to play in an overseas football league when she moved to the Turkish Konak Belediyespor team to play in the Turkish Women's Football Premier League.

Early life 
Golnoosh Khosravi was born in 2001 in Shahinshahr, Isfahan, as the only child. She lost his father and went on with her mother.

Career 
Khosravi entered the field of football at the age of 10. She was with Zob Ahan Isfahan's at the age of 14. In August 2019, Khosravi signed a two-year contract with the Turkish Konak Belediyespor team and began to play in the Turkish Women's Football Premier League, making her the youngest Iranian woman football player to play abroad. She played as a right midfielder and as a left midfielder in Konak Belediyespor. Due to her physical resemblance and fast style of play, she was compared to Neymar. 

Due to the COVID-19 pandemic in Turkey, Khosravi was quarantined in Turkey away from her family and could not return to Iran after 10 months of playing in the Turkish league, and celebrated her 19th birthday alone. She appeared in six matches of the 2019-20 Turkish Women's First League season. 

Upon returning to Iran, she began training at the Iranian national team camp.

In 2021, Khosravi played with Iranian women's national team and represented Iran in 2022 AFC Women's Asian Cup qualification matches.

Later in 2021, she joined Bam Khatoon Football Club, the most titled Iranian women's football team.

International goals

References

External links 
 

2001 births
Living people
People from Isfahan Province
Iranian women's footballers
Women's association football wingers
Konak Belediyespor players
Iran women's international footballers
21st-century Iranian women